Mechthild (or Mechtild, Matilda, Matelda) of Magdeburg (c. 1207 – c. 1282/1294), a Beguine, was a Christian medieval mystic, whose book Das fließende Licht der Gottheit (The Flowing Light of Divinity) is a compendium of visions, prayers, dialogues and mystical accounts. She was the first mystic to write in German.

Life
Definite biographical information about Mechthild is scarce; what is known of her life comes largely from scattered hints in her work. She was born into a noble Saxon family. She had her first vision of the Holy Spirit at the age of twelve. In 1230 she left her home and “renounced worldly honour and worldly riches” to become a Beguine at Magdeburg. There, like Hadewijch of Antwerp, she seems to have exercised a position of authority in a Beguine community. In Magdeburg she became acquainted with the Dominicans and became a Dominican tertiary.  It seems clear that she read many of the Dominican writers.  It was her Dominican confessor, Henry of Halle, who encouraged and helped Mechthild to compose The Flowing Light.

Her criticism of church dignitaries and her claims to theological insight aroused so much opposition that some called for the burning of her writings. With advancing age, she was not only isolated and the object of extensive criticism, but she also became blind. Around 1272, she joined the Cistercian nunnery at Helfta, near Eisleben, which offered her protection and support in the final years of her life. Here, she finished writing down the contents of the many divine revelations she says she experienced. It is unclear whether she actually formally joined the Cistercian community or whether she simply resided there and participated in the religious services without taking Cistercian monastic vows. The nuns of Helfta were highly educated and important works of mysticism survive from Mechthild's younger contemporaries, St Mechthild of Hackeborn and St Gertrude the Great.

It is unclear when Mechthild died. 1282 is a commonly cited date, but some scholars believe she lived into the 1290s.

Composition
Mechthild's book is written in the Middle Low German that was spoken in the region of Magdeburg at the time. It includes phrases in Latin.

Works
Mechthild's writings comprise the seven books of Das fließende Licht der Gottheit (The Flowing Light of Divinity), which was composed between 1250 and 1280. There appear to have been three stages in the evolution of the work. The first five books were finished by about 1260. During the next decade Mechthild added a sixth book. After joining the community of Cistercian nuns at Helfta around 1272, she added a seventh book, rather different in tone from the previous six.

The Flowing Light was originally written in Middle Low German, the language of northern Germany. While her original composition is now lost, the text survives in two later versions. First, around 1290, Dominican friars of the Halle community translated the first six books into Latin. Then, in the mid-fourteenth century, the secular priest Henry of Nördlingen translated The Flowing Light into the Alemannic dialect of Middle High German. This version survives complete in one manuscript and in fragmentary form in three others.

What is unusual about her writings is that she composed her work in Middle Low German at a time when most wisdom literature was composed in Latin. Thus she is remembered as an early proponent and popularizer of German as a language worthy of the divine and holy. Mechthild's writing is exuberant and highly sophisticated. Her images of Hell are believed by some scholars to have influenced Dante Alighieri's The Divine Comedy, and Mechthild is thought to have been represented by Dante in that work, in the character of Matelda. However, there is no concrete evidence for this and there are important differences in Dante's conception of Hell.

While her work was translated into Latin during her lifetime, it had been largely forgotten by the 15th century. It was rediscovered in the late 19th century by Pater Gall Morel, who published the first edition. Her work has been increasingly studied, both for its academic interest and as a work of devotional literature.

Mechthild is celebrated as a Saint in local calendars of the Roman Rite and recorded on 19 November in the most recent edition of the Martyrologium Romanum.

Though without evident connections, Mechthild is  remembered  in the Church of England with a commemoration on 19 November.

Remembrance Days and Artifacts 

 Catholic: November 19th (locally canonized)
 Evangelical: February 26th (in Calendar of Saints)
 Anglican: November 19th (in Common Worship), May 28th Episcopal Church

A sculpture of Mechthild of Magdeburg, The Holy Mechthild von Magdeburg, is on display in the Magdeburg Sculpture Park. It was created by Susan Turcot as part of a project in collaboration with the Art Museum of the Kloster Unser Lieben Frauen. It was installed in the sculpture park in 2010.

Radio adaptations 
The Medievalist Hildegard Elisabeth Keller integrated Mechthild von Magdeburg as one of five main female characters in her work The Trilogy of the Timeless, published at the end of September 2011. Selected passages have been included in the radio play The Ocean in the Thimble, which she wrote and staged. In the fictional encounter, Mechthild talks to Hildegard von Bingen, Hadewijch and Etty Hillesum.

References

Published editions 

  
 
  [critical edition of the Middle High German text]
  (preface by Margot Schmidt) [translation into English]
 [edition of the Middle High German text with facing translation into modern German]

Works cited 
  (Also available at Internet Archive)

Further reading

External links

 
 

1210 births
1285 deaths
13th-century Christian mystics
13th-century Christian saints
13th-century German women writers
13th-century philosophers
13th-century German Catholic theologians
13th-century German philosophers
Beguines and Beghards
Female saints of medieval Germany
German Christian mystics
Dominican mystics
German philosophers
13th-century German nuns
German women philosophers
German women writers
Medieval German saints
Rhineland mystics
Roman Catholic mystics
Women religious writers
Anglican saints
Women mystics